René Grandjean (born 1872, date of death unknown) was a French football player who competed in the 1900 Olympic Games. In Paris he won a silver medal as a member of the Club Français club team.

References

External links

René Grandjean's profile at Sports Reference.com

1872 births
Year of death missing
French footballers
Olympic silver medalists for France
Olympic footballers of France
Footballers at the 1900 Summer Olympics
Olympic medalists in football
Medalists at the 1900 Summer Olympics
Association football forwards
Place of birth missing